Ruding is a surname. Notable people with the surname include: 

Onno Ruding (born 1939), Dutch politician
Rogers Ruding (1751–1820), English cleric, academic, and numismatist